Spermacoce alata, the winged false buttonweed, is a species of plant in the Rubiaceae. It is widespread across the warmer parts of the Western Hemisphere and naturalized in many other parts of the world.

Description
Spermacoce alata is a perennial herb, sometimes erect but other times decumbent. Stems are square in cross-section, with wings along the corners running lengthwise along the stem. Leaves are elliptical to oblong, up to 8 cm long. Flowers are white to very pale purple, formed in axillary clumps.

Distribution
Spermacoce alata is considered native to southern Mexico, Central America, a few islands in the Caribbean (Trinidad and the Leeward Islands), and parts of South America (French Guiana, Suriname, Guyana, Venezuela, Colombia, Ecuador, Peru, Brazil, Paraguay and Argentina). It is reportedly naturalized in tropical Africa (from Liberia to Uganda), China (Fujian, Guangdong, Hainan, Taiwan, Zhejiang), India, Nepal, Sri Lanka, Bangladesh, the Andaman & Nicobar Islands, Malaysia, Thailand, Borneo, Java, Myanmar (Burma), Sumatra, Queensland, the (Australian) Northern Territory, Fiji and Samoa.

References

External links
Flowers of India
Discover Life
Les galeries photos de plantes et de jardinsvignette Spermacoce alata 

alata
Flora of Mexico
Flora of Central America
Flora of Trinidad and Tobago
Flora of the Leeward Islands
Flora of South America
Plants described in 1775
Flora without expected TNC conservation status